Robert C. Barnfield (1856–1893) was an English painter who was born in Gloucester.  He trained in London as an architect, but relocated to New Zealand in 1883 because of his asthma.  In 1885, he arrived in Honolulu aboard the Explorer.  He remained in Honolulu, where he painted and gave art lessons, until his death on 14 May 1893 at age 37.

The Bishop Museum (Honolulu), the Honolulu Museum of Art and ʻIolani Palace are among the public collections holding paintings by Robert C. Barnfield.

References
 Forbes, David W., "Encounters with Paradise: Views of Hawaii and its People, 1778-1941", Honolulu Academy of Arts, 1992, 168, 171.
 Severson, Don R., Finding Paradise: Island Art in Private Collections, University of Hawaii Press, 2002, p. 84.

External links
 Robert Barnfield in AskArt.com
 Smithsonian American Art Museum, Art Inventories Catalog

1856 births
1893 deaths
19th-century English painters
English male painters
British emigrants to New Zealand
19th-century English male artists